Below is a list of the 25 members of the European Parliament for the Netherlands in the 2009 to 2014 session. One person from Party for Freedom entered the Parliament in December 2011, bringing the number of MEPs to 26.

Party representation

2009 election

2011 
After the ratification of the Lisbon Treaty by all member states, the Netherlands got 1 extra seat in parliament.
This extra seat was treated as a remainder seat of the 2009 election.

Mutations

2009
 4 June: Election for the European Parliament in the Netherlands.
 14 June: The election committee elects Laurence Stassen for the empty seat of Geert Wilders in the European Parliament, because Geert Wilders did not accept the seat.
 14 July: Beginning of the 7th European Parliament session. (2009–2014)

2010
 1 June: Kartika Liotard leaves the SP after a conflict with Dennis de Jong and continues as an independent. She does remain part of the European United Left–Nordic Green Left group.
 17 June: Louis Bontes (PVV) leaves the European Parliament, taking his seat in the Dutch Parliament after the 2010 Dutch general election.
 17 June: Jeanine Hennis-Plasschaert (VVD) leaves the European Parliament, taking her seat in the Dutch Parliament after the 2010 Dutch general election.
 22 June: Jan Mulder (VVD) is installed in the European Parliament as a replacement for Jeanine Hennis-Plasschaert.
 22 June: Lucas Hartong (PVV) is installed in the European Parliament as a replacement for Louis Bontes.

2011
 31 August: Daniël van der Stoep (PVV) leaves the European Parliament.
 8 September: Auke Zijlstra (PVV) is installed in the European Parliament as a replacement for Daniël van der Stoep.
 15 December: The Netherlands gets one extra seat after the Lisbon Treaty was ratified by all EU member states.
 15 December: The Party for Freedom is awarded one extra seat, based on the 2009 European Election. Daniël van der Stoep (PVV) is installed in the European Parliament.
 18 December: The Party for Freedom delegation refuses to accept Daniël van der Stoep. Daniël van der Stoep continues as an independent

2012
 20 September: Barry Madlener (PVV) leaves the European Parliament, taking his seat in the Dutch Parliament after the 2012 Dutch general election.
 27 September: Patricia van der Kammen (PVV) is installed in the European Parliament as a replacement for Barry Madlener.

2013
 17 October: Toine Manders leaves the VVD and continues as an independent. He does remain part of the Alliance of Liberals and Democrats for Europe group.

2014
 21 March: Laurence Stassen leaves the PVV and continues as an independent.

List

By name 

| style="text-align:left;" colspan="11" | 
|-
! Name
! Sex
! National party
! EP Group
! Period
! Preference vote
|-
| style="text-align:left;" | Hans van Baalen
| style="text-align:left;" | Male
| style="text-align:left;" |  People's Party for Freedom and Democracy
| style="text-align:left;" |  ALDE
| style="text-align:left;" | 14 July 2009 – 2 July 2019
| style="text-align:left;" | 367,796
|-
| style="text-align:left;" | Bas Belder
| style="text-align:left;" | Male
| style="text-align:left;" |  Reformed Political Party
| style="text-align:left;" |  EFD
| style="text-align:left;" | 20 July 1999 – 2 July 2019
| style="text-align:left;" | 53,450
|-
| style="text-align:left;" | Thijs Berman
| style="text-align:left;" | Male
| style="text-align:left;" |  Labour Party
| style="text-align:left;" |  S&D
| style="text-align:left;" | 20 July 2004 – 1 July 2014
| style="text-align:left;" | 372,060
|-
| style="text-align:left;" | Louis Bontes
| style="text-align:left;" | Male
| style="text-align:left;" |  Party for Freedom
| style="text-align:left;" |  NI
| style="text-align:left;" | 14 July 2009 – 17 June 2010
| style="text-align:left;" | 6,751
|-
| style="text-align:left;" | Emine Bozkurt
| style="text-align:left;" | Female
| style="text-align:left;" |  Labour Party
| style="text-align:left;" |  S&D
| style="text-align:left;" | 20 July 2004 – 1 July 2014
| style="text-align:left;" | 66,385
|-
| style="text-align:left;" | Wim van de Camp
| style="text-align:left;" | Male
| style="text-align:left;" |  Christian Democratic Appeal
| style="text-align:left;" |  EPP
| style="text-align:left;" | 14 July 2009 – 2 July 2019
| style="text-align:left;" | 579,775
|-
| style="text-align:left;" | Marije Cornelissen
| style="text-align:left;" | Female
| style="text-align:left;" |  GreenLeft
| style="text-align:left;" |  G–EFA
| style="text-align:left;" | 14 July 2009 – 1 July 2014
| style="text-align:left;" | 14,486
|-
| style="text-align:left;" | Peter van Dalen
| style="text-align:left;" | Male
| style="text-align:left;" |  Christian Union
| style="text-align:left;" |  ECR
| style="text-align:left;" | 14 July 2009 – Present
| style="text-align:left;" | 209,947
|-
| style="text-align:left;" | Bas Eickhout
| style="text-align:left;" | Male
| style="text-align:left;" |  GreenLeft
| style="text-align:left;" |  G–EFA
| style="text-align:left;" | 14 July 2009 – Present
| style="text-align:left;" | 13,782
|-
| style="text-align:left;" | Gerben-Jan Gerbrandy
| style="text-align:left;" | Male
| style="text-align:left;" |  Democrats 66
| style="text-align:left;" |  ALDE
| style="text-align:left;" | 14 July 2009 – 2 July 2019
| style="text-align:left;" | 18,107
|-
| style="text-align:left;" | Lucas Hartong
| style="text-align:left;" | Male
| style="text-align:left;" |  Party for Freedom
| style="text-align:left;" |  NI
| style="text-align:left;" | 22 June 2010 – 1 July 2014
| style="text-align:left;" | 2,571
|-
| style="text-align:left;" | Jeanine Hennis-Plasschaert
| style="text-align:left;" | Female
| style="text-align:left;" |  People's Party for Freedom and Democracy
| style="text-align:left;" |  ALDE
| style="text-align:left;" | 20 July 2004 – 17 June 2010
| style="text-align:left;" | 52,184
|-
| style="text-align:left;" | Dennis de Jong
| style="text-align:left;" | Male
| style="text-align:left;" |  Socialist Party
| style="text-align:left;" |  EUL–NGL
| style="text-align:left;" | 14 July 2009 – 2 July 2019
| style="text-align:left;" | 194,359
|-
| style="text-align:left;" | Patricia van der Kammen
| style="text-align:left;" | Female
| style="text-align:left;" |  Party for Freedom
| style="text-align:left;" |  NI
| style="text-align:left;" | 27 September 2012 – 1 July 2014
| style="text-align:left;" | 12,409
|-
| style="text-align:left;" | Esther de Lange
| style="text-align:left;" | Female
| style="text-align:left;" |  Christian Democratic Appeal
| style="text-align:left;" |  EPP
| style="text-align:left;" | 12 April 2007 – Present
| style="text-align:left;" | 43,406
|-
| style="text-align:left;" | Kartika Liotard
| style="text-align:left;" | Female
| style="text-align:left;" |  Socialist Party (2009–2010) /  Independent
| style="text-align:left;" |  EUL–NGL
| style="text-align:left;" | 20 July 2004 – 1 July 2014
| style="text-align:left;" | 32,426
|-
| style="text-align:left;" | Barry Madlener
| style="text-align:left;" | Male
| style="text-align:left;" |  Party for Freedom
| style="text-align:left;" |  NI
| style="text-align:left;" | 14 July 2009 – 20 September 2012
| style="text-align:left;" |372,060
|-
| style="text-align:left;" | Toine Manders
| style="text-align:left;" | Male
| style="text-align:left;" |  People's Party for Freedom and Democracy (2009–2013) /  Independent
| style="text-align:left;" |  ALDE
| style="text-align:left;" | 20 July 1999 – 1 July 20142 July 2019 – Present
| style="text-align:left;" | 34,973
|-
| style="text-align:left;" | Judith Merkies
| style="text-align:left;" | Female
| style="text-align:left;" |  Labour Party
| style="text-align:left;" |  S&D
| style="text-align:left;" | 14 July 2009 – 1 July 2014
| style="text-align:left;" | 18,553
|-
| style="text-align:left;" | Jan Mulder
| style="text-align:left;" | Male
| style="text-align:left;" |  People's Party for Freedom and Democracy
| style="text-align:left;" |  ALDE
| style="text-align:left;" | 19 July 1994 – 14 July 2009  22 June 2010 – 1 July 2014
| style="text-align:left;" | 12,884
|-
| style="text-align:left;" | Lambert van Nistelrooij
| style="text-align:left;" | Male
| style="text-align:left;" |  Christian Democratic Appeal
| style="text-align:left;" |  EPP
| style="text-align:left;" | 20 July 2004 – 2 July 2019
| style="text-align:left;" | 41,846
|-
| style="text-align:left;" | Ria Oomen-Ruijten
| style="text-align:left;" | Female
| style="text-align:left;" |  Christian Democratic Appeal
| style="text-align:left;" |  EPP
| style="text-align:left;" | 25 July 1989 – 1 July 2014
| style="text-align:left;" | 70,388
|-
| style="text-align:left;" | Judith Sargentini
| style="text-align:left;" | Female
| style="text-align:left;" |  GreenLeft
| style="text-align:left;" |  G–EFA
| style="text-align:left;" | 14 July 2009 – 2 July 2019
| style="text-align:left;" | 321,744
|-
| style="text-align:left;" | Marietje Schaake
| style="text-align:left;" | Female
| style="text-align:left;" |  Democrats 66
| style="text-align:left;" |  ALDE
| style="text-align:left;" | 14 July 2009 – 2 July 2019
| style="text-align:left;" | 18,662
|-
| style="text-align:left;" | Laurence Stassen
| style="text-align:left;" | Female
| style="text-align:left;" |  Party for Freedom (2009–2014) /  Independent
| style="text-align:left;" |  NI
| style="text-align:left;" | 14 July 2009 – 1 July 2014
| style="text-align:left;" | 17,880
|-
| style="text-align:left;" | Daniël van der Stoep
| style="text-align:left;" | Male
| style="text-align:left;" |  Party for Freedom (2009–2011) /  Independent
| style="text-align:left;" |  NI
| style="text-align:left;" | 14 July 2009 – 1 September 2011 15 December 2011 – 1 July 2014
| style="text-align:left;" | 5,650
|-
| style="text-align:left;" | Sophie in 't Veld
| style="text-align:left;" | Female
| style="text-align:left;" |  Democrats 66
| style="text-align:left;" |  ALDE
| style="text-align:left;" | 20 July 2004 – Present
| style="text-align:left;" | 433,957
|-
| style="text-align:left;" | Corien Wortmann-Kool
| style="text-align:left;" | Female
| style="text-align:left;" |  Christian Democratic Appeal
| style="text-align:left;" |  EPP
| style="text-align:left;" | 20 July 2004 – 1 July 2014
| style="text-align:left;" | 48,270
|-
| style="text-align:left;" | Auke Zijlstra
| style="text-align:left;" | Male
| style="text-align:left;" |  Party for Freedom
| style="text-align:left;" |  NI
| style="text-align:left;" | 13 September 2011 – 1 July 2014 7 September 2015 – 2 July 2019
| style="text-align:left;" | 3,617
|-
|-style="background-color:#dcdcdc"
| style="text-align:left;" colspan="6" |Source:
|-
|}

By party 

On the Christian Democratic Appeal list: (EPP Group)

 Esther de Lange
 Ria Oomen-Ruijten
 Wim van de Camp
 Lambert van Nistelrooij
 Corien Wortmann-Kool

On the Party for Freedom list: (NI)

 Louis Bontes (replaced by Lucas Hartong)
 Barry Madlener (replaced by Patricia van der Kammen)
 Daniël van der Stoep (replaced by Auke Zijlstra)
 Laurence Stassen
After Brexit the Netherlands got 1 extra seat and it went to Party for Freedom|
 Daniël van der Stoep

On the Labour Party list: (S&D)

 Thijs Berman
 Emine Bozkurt
 Judith Merkies

On the People's Party for Freedom and Democracy list: (ALDE)

 Jeanine Hennis-Plasschaert (replaced by Jan Mulder)
 Toine Manders
 Hans van Baalen

On the Democrats 66 list: (ALDE)

 Gerben-Jan Gerbrandy
 Sophie in 't Veld
 Marietje Schaake

On the GreenLeft list: (Greens-EFA)

 Marije Cornelissen
 Bas Eickhout
 Judith Sargentini

On the Socialist Party list: (EUL/NGL)

 Dennis de Jong
 Kartika Liotard

On the ChristianUnion – Reformed Political Party list: (ECR and EFD)

 Bas Belder (Reformed Political Party is in EFD)
 Peter van Dalen (Christian Union is in ECR)

Independent: (left their party delegation at some point during this European 2009–2014 session.)
 Kartika Liotard
 Toine Manders
 Laurence Stassen
 Daniël van der Stoep

References 

2009
Netherlands
MEPs for the Netherlands 2009–2014